Kalyani is a 1979 Telugu-language drama film, produced by Venkat Akkineni, Nagarjuna Akkineni under the Annapurna Studios banner and directed by Dasari Narayana Rao. It stars Murali Mohan, Jaya Sudha  and music composed by Ramesh Naidu. The film is based on  Yaddanapudi Sulochana Rani's novel Raagamayi.

Cast
Murali Mohan as Anand
Jaya Sudha as Kavita
Mohan Babu as Raja Rao
Prabhakar Reddy as Anand's father
Dhulipala
Raja Babu as himself
Allu Ramalingaiah as himself
Mada
K. V. Chalam
Eeswar Rao 
Halam
Rajasulochana as Anand's step mother
Nirmalamma as Aajamma

Crew
Art: Bhaskar Raju
Choreography: Saleem
Stills: Mohanji-Jaganji
Lyrics: C. Narayana Reddy, Veturi, Dasam Gopala Krishna 
Playback: S. P. Balasubrahmanyam, P. Susheela, S. Janaki
Music: Ramesh Naidu
Story: Yaddanapudi Sulochana Rani 
Editing: K. Balu
Cinematography: K. S. Mani
Producer: Venkat Akkineni, Nagarjuna Akkineni
Dialogues - Screenplay - Director: Dasari Narayana Rao 
Banner: Annapurna Studios
Release Date: 1979

Soundtrack

Music composed by Ramesh Naidu. Music released on SEA Records Audio Company.

References

1979 films
1970s Telugu-language films
Indian drama films
Films based on Indian novels
Films directed by Dasari Narayana Rao
Films scored by Ramesh Naidu
1979 drama films